Tariq-ur-Rehman (born 22 February 1974) is an Indian former first-class cricketer who played most of his cricket for Bihar. He also coached Air India cricket team as well as Saudi Arabian cricketers after his playing career.

Career
A left-handed batsman and occasional slow left-arm orthodox bowler, Tariq-ur-Rehman played 59 first-class and 45  List A matches for various teams. He appeared for his state team Bihar between 1993/94 and 2002/03, and also represented Assam, Tripura and Jharkhand for one season each. He scored more than 3000 first-class runs and over 1000 runs in List A cricket, and also captained Bihar and Tripura in a few matches. He made appearances for East Zone in the late-1990s. He played his last first-class match in December 2006.

Tariq-ur-Rehman became a cricket coach after retirement. He coached Air India cricket team in the BCCI Corporate Trophy. He then coached Saudi Arabian cricketers and was the coach of the Saudi Arabia Under-19 cricket team that won the 2011 ACC Under-19 Challenge Cup in Kuala Lumpur.

References

External links 
 
 

1974 births
Living people
Indian cricketers
Bihar cricketers
Assam cricketers
Tripura cricketers
Jharkhand cricketers
East Zone cricketers
Indian cricket coaches
People from Darbhanga